Russell Lewis (born 11 September 1963) is an English television writer and former actor. He is the writer of the Inspector Morse prequel Endeavour (2012–2023), and the first two series of Grace (2021-2022).

Career 
Lewis was born in London and began his career as a child actor, first appearing in the films The Looking Glass War (1970) and Sunday Bloody Sunday (1971). He played the 7-year-old Winston Churchill in Young Winston (1972), and featured in the 1973 horror films Tales That Witness Madness (as a boy who befriends an invisible tiger) and Voices. He also starred as George Gathercole in The Kids from 47A. He appeared as the young Lucius in I, Claudius (1976) and in an episode of London's Burning in 1989.

By the mid-1980s, Lewis had begun to write for television series; his writing credits include episodes of Perfect Scoundrels, Taggart, The Bill, Wycliffe, Inspector Morse, Kavanagh QC, The Ambassador, Monsignor Renard, Playing the Field, Without Motive, The Last Detective, Murphy's Law, Spooks and Lewis. Lewis has co-written three of the Sharpe films, Sharpe's Battle, Sharpe's Challenge and 2008's Sharpe's Peril. He also penned several episodes of Cadfael and an episode of Hornblower.

In 2009, Russell adapted Agatha Christie's novel The Pale Horse for the fifth series of ITV's Agatha Christie's Marple, starring Julia McKenzie, which first aired in 2010.

He devised and wrote the Inspector Morse prequel Endeavour which was first broadcast on 2 January 2012. He wrote the pilot film and all 35 of the subsequent one-hour-thirty instalments in total, ranging from Series 1 in 2013 to Series 9 in 2023. 

In 2021, Lewis recorded an Audio Commentary for the first episode of The Bill that he wrote, entitled "Forget-Me-Not", alongside actress Lynne Miller (WPC Cathy Marshall), released on The Bill Podcast Patreon Channel.

Lewis wrote Grace, which is based on the bestselling books by author Peter James. The first series was one standalone episode, with the second series premiering on 24 April 2022.

Awards 
In 1993, Lewis won the Writers' Guild of Great Britain TV - Original Drama Series Award for Between the Lines. The award was shared with the other writers of the show at the time, J.C. Wilsher, Rob Heyland, Steve Trafford and Michael Russell.

Filmography

References

External links 
 

1963 births
Living people
People from Sutton Coldfield
British television writers
Male actors from Birmingham, West Midlands
English male child actors
English male television actors
English male film actors
English television writers
English screenwriters
English male screenwriters
British male television writers